Firey is a surname. Notable people with the surname include:
 Lewis P. Firey (1825–1885), American politician
 William J. Firey (1923–2004), American mathematician